Seung-Goo Lee (李承九, ,February 1, 1959 ~) is a professor of the Hapdong Theological Seminary in South Korea and currently teaches systematic theology. 
He was selected as one of the most influential scholars in the field of the Bible and theology in 2011. He was the president of the Korean Evangelical Theological Society (2020-2022). He was the president of the Korean Presbyterian Theological Society, and of the Korean Reformed Theological Society. He found the Korean Presbyterian Theological Society, the Korean Biblical Theological Society, the Korean kierkegaard Society, and the Peter Paul Johannes Beyerhaus Society for celebrating Peter Beyerhaus. He has published many books and translations. He has written two books in English and more than 20 books in Korean, and has translated 26 books from English to Korean. He interpreted lectures of many foreign scholars, and gave several presentations at the international conferences. He studied Christian Education (B.A.) at Chongshin University, Seoul National University Graduate School (Ethics Education, M. Ed.), Hapdong Theological Graduate University (M. Div.), and  did his Ph.D.(1990) at the University of St. Andrews under the supervision of Dr. Daphne Hampson. He had Research Fellow in Yale University Divinity School (1990-1992).

Career 
 Professor of Systematic Theology, Westminster Graduate School of Theology (1992.1-1999.2.)
 Professor of Systematic Theology, International Graduate School of Theology (1999.3-2009.2)
 Professor of Systematic Theology, Hapdong Graduate School of Theology (2009,3-present)
 Visiting Scholar, Calvin College, Calvin Institute (Summer 2000)
 Visiting Scholar, Faculty of Theology, Vrije Universiteit, Amsterdam (fall 2006)
 president of the Korean Evangelical Systematic Theology Society (2000-2002), editor-in-chief of the Research Systematic Theology (2009)
 Auditor of the Korean Evangelical Theological Society (2004- 2006), Editor-in-Chief (2006)
 Secretary of the Korean Bible Theological Society (1997-present)
 General Secretary of the Korean Society for Reformation (2004-2006), Director of General Affairs (2008-2012)
 Secretary of the Korean Presbyterian Theological Society (2004-2006), Secretary (2008-present), Editor-in-Chief of Presbyterian Church and Theology (2009)
 President of the Korean Society of Kierkegaard (2005)
 Chairman of Education Committee, Christian Research Institute (2003-2005), Research Fellow (2001-present)
 Chairman of the Executive Committee for the 500th Anniversary of the Reformation (2011-present)
 Journal of Reformed Theology, Asian Editor (2006-Present)
 Vice-President, Korean Reformation Society (2012-2018)
 Member of Korean Academy of Christian Studies
 Senior Vice President, Korean Evangelical Theological Society (2018-2020)
 President of the Korean Presbyterian Theological Society (2016-2018)
 Vice-President, Korean Reformation Society (2012-2018)
 President of the Korean Reformation Society (2018-2020)
 Director and executive secretary of the Beyer House Society (2018-)

Reference 

 언약교회
 성경구절 왜곡 사이비에 가까워
 기독교 세계관
 이승구교수의 개혁신학과 우리사회이야기 홈페이지
 CTS 뉴스The보기 안명준 교수(평택대학교)/이승구 교수(합동신학대학원대학교)

See also 

 Hapdong Theological Seminary
 Bong-ho Son 
 Yung-Han Kim

References 

1959  births
Kierkegaard scholars
Jeonju Yi clan
Systematic theologians
Presidents of learned societies
Alumni of the University of St Andrews
South Korean Presbyterians
South Korean pastors
South Korean theologians
Living people
Academic staff of Hapdong Theological Seminary
21st-century Calvinist and Reformed Christians
South Korean Calvinist and Reformed Christians